The multivariate stable distribution is a multivariate probability distribution that is a multivariate generalisation of the univariate stable distribution.  The multivariate stable distribution defines linear relations between stable distribution marginals.  In the same way as for the univariate case, the distribution is defined in terms of its characteristic function.

The multivariate stable distribution can also be thought as an extension of the multivariate normal distribution. It has parameter, α, which is defined over the range 0 < α ≤ 2, and where the case α = 2 is equivalent to the multivariate normal distribution. It has an additional skew parameter that allows for non-symmetric distributions, where the multivariate normal distribution is symmetric.

Definition 

 

where 0 < α < 2, and for 

This is essentially the result of Feldheim, that any stable random vector can be characterized by a spectral measure  (a finite measure on ) and a shift vector .

Parametrization using projections
Another way to describe a stable random vector is in terms of projections. For any vector , the projection  is univariate stable with some skewness , scale  and some shift . The notation  is used if X is stable with

for every . This is called the projection parameterization.

The spectral measure determines the projection parameter functions by:

Special cases
There are special cases where the multivariate characteristic function takes a simpler form.  Define the characteristic function of a stable marginal as

Isotropic multivariate stable distribution
The characteristic function is
 
The spectral measure is continuous and uniform, leading to radial/isotropic symmetry.
For the multinormal case , this corresponds to independent components, but so is not the case when . Isotropy is a special case of ellipticity (see the next paragraph) – just take  to be a multiple of the identity matrix.

Elliptically contoured multivariate stable distribution
The elliptically contoured multivariate stable distribution is a special symmetric case of the multivariate stable distribution.
If X is α-stable and elliptically contoured, then it has joint characteristic function  
  
for some shift vector  (equal to the mean when it exists) and some positive definite matrix  (akin to a correlation matrix, although the usual definition of correlation fails to be meaningful).
Note the relation to characteristic function of the multivariate normal distribution:  obtained when α = 2.

Independent components
characteristic function is
 
Observe that when α = 2 this reduces again to the multivariate normal; note that the iid case and the isotropic case do not coincide when α < 2.
Independent components is a special case of discrete spectral measure (see next paragraph), with the spectral measure supported by the standard unit vectors.

Discrete
If the spectral measure is discrete with mass  at 
the characteristic function is

Linear properties 
If  is d-dimensional, A is an m x d matrix, and  
then AX + b is m-dimensional -stable with scale function   skewness function  and location function

Inference in the independent component model 
Recently it was shown how to compute inference in closed-form in a linear model (or equivalently a factor analysis model), involving independent component models.

More specifically, let  be a set of i.i.d. unobserved univariate drawn from a stable distribution. Given a known linear relation matrix A of size , the observation  are assumed to be distributed as a convolution of the hidden factors  . . The inference task is to compute the most probable , given the linear relation matrix A and the observations . This task can be computed in closed-form in O(n3).

An application for this construction is multiuser detection with stable, non-Gaussian noise.

See also
 Multivariate Cauchy distribution
 Multivariate normal distribution

Resources
 Mark Veillette's stable distribution matlab package http://www.mathworks.com/matlabcentral/fileexchange/37514
 The plots in this page where plotted using Danny Bickson's inference in linear-stable model Matlab package: https://www.cs.cmu.edu/~bickson/stable

Notes

Multivariate continuous distributions
Probability distributions with non-finite variance